Virinta is a river of  Anykščiai district municipality, Utena County, northeastern Lithuania.

It is a tributary of the Šventoji.

References
 LIETUVOS RESPUBLIKOS UPIŲ IR TVENKINIŲ KLASIFIKATORIUS (Republic of Lithuania- River and Pond Classifications).  Ministry of Environment (Lithuania). Accessed 2011-11-17.

Rivers of Lithuania
Anykščiai District Municipality